Myriospora is a genus of parasitic alveolates belonging to the phylum Apicomplexa.

Taxonomy

This genus was created in 1913 by Lermantoff.

Currently two species are recognised in this genus.

Life cycle

Host records

References

Apicomplexa genera